Amy Lucille Chapman (born 12 February 1987 in Albury) is an Australian soccer player, playing with Brisbane Roar. She represented Australia between 2007 and 2013.

Playing career
Chapman played 12 times for Canberra United in the Australian W-League.
 
Chapman joined Brisbane Roar in 2010.

In mid-2011 Chapman signed for the Los Angeles Strikers in the USL W-League, playing 21 times in two seasons.

Chapman played for Australia at the 2006 FIFA U-20 Women's World Championship finals in Russia.

In 2007 Chapman made her debut for the Australia women's national soccer team. She made the last of 20 Matildas appearances in 2013.

International goals

Honours

Club
Brisbane Roar:
 W-League Premiership: 2010-11
 W-League Championship: 2012-13

International
Australia
 AFF Women's Championship: 2008

References

External links
 
 
 Matildas Player Profiles

Living people
Australian women's soccer players
1987 births
USL W-League (1995–2015) players
Australia women's international soccer players
Women's association football midfielders
Brisbane Roar FC (A-League Women) players
Canberra United FC players
A-League Women players
Sportspeople from Albury
Sportswomen from New South Wales
Soccer players from New South Wales
Los Angeles Strikers players
Australian expatriate sportspeople in the United States
Expatriate women's soccer players in the United States
Twin sportspeople
Australian twins